Héctor Clavel (17 September 1920 – 26 April 1982) was a Chilean equestrian. He competed in two events at the 1952 Summer Olympics.

References

1920 births
1982 deaths
Chilean male equestrians
Olympic equestrians of Chile
Chilean dressage riders
Equestrians at the 1952 Summer Olympics
Pan American Games medalists in equestrian
Pan American Games gold medalists for Chile
Pan American Games silver medalists for Chile
Pan American Games bronze medalists for Chile
Equestrians at the 1951 Pan American Games
Equestrians at the 1955 Pan American Games
Equestrians at the 1963 Pan American Games
Place of birth missing
Medalists at the 1951 Pan American Games
Medalists at the 1955 Pan American Games
Medalists at the 1963 Pan American Games
20th-century Chilean people